Sunny Leone is a Canadian-American actress and model, currently active in Indian film industry. She is a former pornstar. She was named Penthouse Pet of the Year in 2003, was a contract performer for Vivid Entertainment, and was named by Maxim as one of the 12 top porn stars in 2010. She has played roles in independent mainstream events, films and television shows. Her first mainstream appearance was in 2005, when she worked as a red carpet reporter for the MTV Video Music Awards on MTV India. She participated in the Indian reality television series Bigg Boss (2011–12). She also has been co-hosting the Indian reality TV show Splitsvilla (2014–present). In 2012 she made her Bollywood debut in Pooja Bhatt's erotic thriller Jism 2 (2012) and shifted her focus to mainstream acting which was followed up with Jackpot (2013), Ragini MMS 2 (2014), Ek Paheli Leela (2015), One Night Stand (2016) and Tera Intezaar (2017). She is known to be one of the porn stars. Sunny Leone also worked in a Bangla Cinema in an item number.

Filmography

Indian films

Nepalese films

Bangladeshi films

Music videos

American films

Pornographic films

Television

Web series

Other media appearances

Awards and nominations

References

External links
 
 Sunny Leone at Bollywood Hungama

Indian filmographies
Actress filmographies
American filmographies
Canadian filmographies